David Oman McKay (September 8, 1873 – January 18, 1970) was an American religious leader and educator who served as the ninth president of the Church of Jesus Christ of Latter-day Saints (LDS Church) from 1951 until his death in 1970. Ordained an apostle and member of the Quorum of the Twelve Apostles in 1906, McKay was an active general authority for nearly 64 years, longer than anyone else in LDS Church history. (Eldred G. Smith was a general authority for 66 years, but only served actively for 32 years, prior to being designated as emeritus.)

Early life
McKay's mother was a Welsh immigrant from Merthyr Tydfil, and his father was a Scottish immigrant from Caithness. In 1880, after the death of McKay’s two older sisters, Margaret and Ellena, his father was called on an LDS mission to his native Scotland, where he proselytized for two years. In his father's absence, seven-year-old McKay had additional family responsibilities and helped his mother.

McKay's grandmother bequeathed $5,000 to McKay's mother upon her death and directed that "every cent ... be used for the education of the children." This money allowed McKay, his brother Thomas, and his younger sisters Jeanette and Annie to attend the University of Utah. McKay graduated in 1897 as valedictorian and class president.

Immediately afterward, he was called on a mission to Great Britain. Like his father, he presided over the Scottish district of the church. Early in his mission, he was impressed by a motto that he saw inscribed on a building in Stirling, "What E'er Thou Art, Act Well Thy Part". This message became a source of inspiration throughout his life.

Career in education

Upon his return from Scotland in late 1899, McKay taught at the high school level at LDS Weber Stake Academy (predecessor of Weber State University). He married Emma Ray Riggs in the Salt Lake Temple on January 2, 1901. They eventually had seven children, one dying as a young child.For his first three years at Weber, McKay taught mainly religion and literature classes. On April 17, 1902, McKay was appointed principal of Weber, succeeding the founding principal, Louis F. Moench, who had resigned after nine years in the position. One of his first actions as principal was to organize a school paper. He oversaw the inauguration of sports programs at Weber, with men's and women's basketball teams organized during McKay's tenure. In 1905, they won their baseball game against the University of Utah.

In 1905, church apostles John W. Taylor and Matthias F. Cowley resigned from the Quorum of the Twelve due to disagreement over the manifesto forbidding polygamy, and apostle Marriner W. Merrill died in early 1906. With three vacancies, George F. Richards, Orson F. Whitney, and McKay were called as apostles in the LDS Church's April 1906 general conference. McKay was 32 years of age at the time.

Prior to this appointment to full-time service, McKay had planned on a career in education and educational administration. He stayed active in education even after his appointment, continuing as principal of the Weber Stake Academy until 1908 (replaced by Wilford M. McKendrick). McKay stayed at Weber Stake Academy to see the completion of new building projects that he had begun. He also served on the Weber school's board of trustees until 1922, and on the University of Utah's board of regents from 1921 to 1922.

McKay enjoyed a long, personal friendship with John F. Fitzpatrick, who published the Salt Lake Tribune from 1924 until 1960. They met weekly for breakfast to discuss the betterment of Utah. Fitzpatrick organized the Newspaper Agency Corporation, a joint operating agreement between the Salt Lake Tribune (represented as the Kearns Corporation) and the church-owned Deseret News, and consulted extensively with McKay to form this mutually beneficial business in 1952.

Member of the Quorum of the Twelve

In October 1906, McKay became an assistant to the superintendent of the Deseret Sunday School Union. At the time, Joseph F. Smith was both President of the Church and Superintendent of the Sunday School, so many of the actual duties of the Sunday School were performed by McKay. After Smith's death in November 1918, McKay became the Sunday School superintendent.

In 1920, the First Presidency assigned McKay to make a worldwide tour of the missions of the LDS Church with Hugh J. Cannon, who recorded the journey of some 61,646 miles. They opened a new mission to China, traveled to Hawaii (where McKay had a vision, promising to build a school near the temple), and visited Samoa, Tonga, New Zealand, and Palestine. In Palestine they met Wilford Booth and visited Armenian Latter-day Saints. McKay returned to Utah on Christmas Eve 1921.

From 1923 until 1925, McKay served as president of the church's European Mission, headquartered in London, with the responsibility of all LDS Church functions in the British Isles and supervision of mission presidents. In this position, McKay first used the slogan "every member a missionary" for outreach promotion. The philosophy has since been taught as a general theme throughout the church.

In 1934, McKay became Second Counselor in the First Presidency under Heber J. Grant. He served in that capacity until Grant's death in May 1945, and when Grant was succeeded by George Albert Smith, McKay was called to continue as Second Counselor in the new Presidency.

Influence on education
Within the leadership of the LDS Church, McKay focused on education. As General Superintendent of the church's Sunday School organization from 1918 to 1934, McKay built LDS seminaries near public high schools throughout Utah, allowing students to take LDS religious courses along with their secular high school education. McKay also transferred three LDS colleges to the state of Utah in the 1920s: Snow College, Weber State University and Dixie College. Utah underfunded the institutions and in 1953 the governor, J. Bracken Lee, offered to give them back to the LDS Church. McKay, then president of the church, said he would accept them and the proposal was placed on the 1954 election ballot. Since it failed to pass, the three institutions remained property of the state.

McKay guided the remaining LDS school in Utah, Brigham Young University (BYU) into a full four-year university. McKay was the fourth Commissioner of Church Education in 1920 and 1921.

In honor of his service, the BYU School of Education was named the McKay School of Education. Weber State University's school of education also carries his name.

President of the LDS Church 
President Heber J. Grant chose McKay to serve as Second Counselor in the First Presidency in 1934. He served in the presidency under church president Grant, and then under George Albert Smith Smith until 1951. In 1950 he also became President of the Quorum of the Twelve Apostles when his predecessor George F. Richards passed, making McKay the second most senior apostle after the church's president. He was set apart as president of the church on April 9, 1951, upon Smith's death. He was 77 years old upon assuming the presidency, and served for 19 years until his death. During this time, the number of members and stakes in the LDS Church nearly tripled, from 1.1 million to 2.8 million, and 184 to 500 respectively.

McKay was an outspoken critic of communism, opposing its perceived atheist underpinnings and denial of freedom of choice. Similarly, communist nations generally forbid proselytizing by the LDS Church and most other religions.

In 1951, McKay began plans for what eventually became BYU-Hawaii. In 1954 he made another trip around the world, visiting Brazil, South Africa, Fiji, Tonga, and other countries.

Under McKay's administration, the LDS Church's stance on Africans holding the priesthood was softened. Beginning in the mid-1950s, members of suspected African descent no longer needed to prove their lineage was not African, allowing dark-skinned members to receive the priesthood unless it was proved that they were of African descent. This policy improved proselytizing in racially mixed areas, such as South America and South Africa. Blacks of verifiable African descent (including most in the United States) were not permitted to hold the priesthood until eight years after McKay's death.

Beginning in 1961, the LDS Church spearheaded the Priesthood Correlation Program. By the 1970s, all church organizations were placed under direct priesthood leadership. These organizations became known as auxiliary organizations, which continue to the present day.

Film director Cecil B. DeMille consulted with McKay during the production of his 1956 epic film The Ten Commandments, forming a friendship until DeMille's death. McKay invited DeMille to BYU, where he delivered a commencement address in 1957.

McKay regularly traveled until his 90s. His deteriorating health in the mid-1960s ultimately led to the appointment of three additional counselors in the First Presidency, as existing members were increasingly infirm and often unable to preside at meetings. By 1968, the First Presidency was composed of six members, larger than it had been at the death of Brigham Young in 1877. McKay's counselors in the First Presidency were Stephen L Richards (First Counselor, 1951–59); J. Reuben Clark, Jr. (Second Counselor (1951–59, First Counselor 1959–61); Henry D. Moyle (Second Counselor 1959–61, First Counselor 1961–63); Hugh B. Brown (Third Counselor 1961, Second Counselor 1961–63, First Counselor 1963–70); N. Eldon Tanner (Second Counselor, 1963–70); Thorpe B. Isaacson (Counselor, 1965–70); Joseph Fielding Smith (Counselor, 1965–70); Alvin R. Dyer (Counselor, 1968–70).

Death
McKay died on January 18, 1970, at age 96, surrounded by most of his family. The cause of death was acute congestion. He had lived longer than any previous leader of the church. Funeral services were held in the Salt Lake Tabernacle. McKay was buried in the Salt Lake City Cemetery.

Family ties
His younger brother, Thomas Evans McKay (1875–1958), was a prominent missionary and mission leader for the LDS Church in Switzerland and Germany; he also served as an Assistant to the Quorum of the Twelve Apostles from 1941 to 1958.

McKay's niece, Fawn McKay Brodie, was the author of the controversial book No Man Knows My History, a highly critical biography of Joseph Smith, the publication of which led to her eventual excommunication from the LDS Church.

McKay's oldest son, David Lawrence McKay, was the eighth general superintendent of the LDS Church's Sunday School organization. When his father was ill, his son David often read his father's sermons during general conference.

One of McKay's granddaughters is Joyce McKay Bennett, wife of former United States Senator Bob Bennett. Another grandchild, Alan Ashton, was the co-founder and co-owner of computer program WordPerfect.

The Events Center at Utah Valley University in Orem, the David O. McKay Events Center, carried McKay's name between 1996 and 2010, after an anonymous donation was given in his honor. In 2010 the name was changed (to "Utah Community Credit Center") due to a fund-raising need at the university, and McKay's name was affixed to the university's Education Center instead.

Teachings
McKay was concerned with missionary work, and coined the phrase "Every member a missionary" in order to encourage church members to become more engaged in that work, and not just leave it to the full-time missionaries.

McKay's statement that "[n]o other success can compensate for failure in the home" is taught to LDS Church members as an important principle.

McKay's teachings as an apostle were the 2005 course of study in the LDS Church's Sunday Relief Society and Melchizedek priesthood classes.

Works

 
 
 
 
 
 
 
 
 
 
 
 
  LDS Church publication number 36492.

Notes

References
 .
 
 .
 .

Further reading

External links

 
 
 Grampa Bill's G.A. Pages: David O. McKay
David O. McKay School of Education at Brigham Young University
David O. McKay Champion of Freedom - patriotic quotes of David O. McKay.
David O. McKay and the Rise of Modern Mormonism - Review of major David O. McKay biography
 David Oman McKay papers, 1897-1983, held by the University of Utah Special Collections 

1873 births
1970 deaths
19th-century Mormon missionaries
American general authorities (LDS Church)
American Latter Day Saint writers
American Mormon missionaries in Scotland
American people of Scottish descent
Apostles (LDS Church)
Burials at Salt Lake City Cemetery
Commissioners of Church Education (LDS Church)
Counselors in the First Presidency (LDS Church)
Counselors in the General Presidency of the Sunday School (LDS Church)
General Presidents of the Sunday School (LDS Church)
McKay family
Mission presidents (LDS Church)
People from Huntsville, Utah
Presidents of the Church (LDS Church)
Presidents of the Quorum of the Twelve Apostles (LDS Church)
Presidents of Weber State University
University of Utah alumni
Weber State University people
American people of Welsh descent
American anti-communists